Cody Arens (born November 8, 1993) is an American actor. He is the brother of Logan Arens and Skye Arens.

Career
He is most notable for the voice of Littlefoot  in The Land Before Time television series based on the films and The Land Before Time XIII: The Wisdom of Friends and as the role of Liam Fitzpatrick, the younger brother of Maddie Fitzpatrick, on The Suite Life of Zack & Cody. He also plays as the young Ethan Kendrick in the film D-War, which was released in the United States on September 14, 2007, and is the voice of young Jaster in Rogue Galaxy. He also had a minor role in Meet the Parents in 2000 and Anger Management in 2003.

Filmography

Film

Television

Video games

Awards
In 2005, Cody won a Young Artist Award for the 2004 TV Movie Plainsong.
 
He also appeared on Malcolm In The Middle as Malcolm's when he was six years old.

References

External links

1993 births
Living people
American male child actors
People from Richmond, Vermont
American male voice actors